The Roman Catholic Diocese of Rzeszów is a diocese located in the city of Rzeszów in the Ecclesiastical province of Przemyśl in Poland.

History
 March 25, 1992: Established as Diocese of Rzeszów from the Diocese of Przemyśl and Diocese of Tarnów

Leadership
 Bishops of Rzeszów (Roman rite)
 Bishop Kazimierz Górny (March 25, 1992 – June 14, 2013)
 Bishop Jan Wątroba (since July 19, 2013)

See also
Roman Catholicism in Poland

Sources
 GCatholic.org
 Catholic Hierarchy
  Diocese website
 Major Seminary of Rzeszów

References

Roman Catholic dioceses in Poland
Christian organizations established in 1992
Rzeszów
Roman Catholic dioceses and prelatures established in the 20th century